Nee Soon Constituency was a single member constituency in the northern area in Singapore that was created in 1959 general elections and ceased to exist prior to 1988 general elections.

History
Nee Soon was one of the rural areas in the north of Singapore. At its inception in 1959, there were only 8,694 voters even including present-day Ang Mo Kio town, whereas wards  nearer to the city centre such as Kreta Ayer had 14,173 voters in a much smaller area.

This ward was finally dissolved prior to the 1988 general elections, with most of the ward forming Nee Soon South SMC consisting of Khatib and Yio Chu Kang (near Yio Chu Kang MRT station), and the portion in Yishun Central being renamed Nee Soon Central SMC where former opposition MP Cheo Chai Chen made his debut there. The remainder of this constituency was carved into 2 sub-divisions of Chong Pang and Nee Soon East. The latter ward was a part of Sembawang GRC until the 2001 general elections which saw  the Workers' Party contest there.

Member of Parliament

Elections

Elections in the 1980s

Elections in the 1970s

Elections in the 1960s

Elections in the 1950s

See also
Nee Soon Central SMC
Nee Soon East SMC
Nee Soon South SMC
Nee Soon GRC

References
1984 GE's result
1980 GE's result
1976 GE's result
1972 GE's result
1968 GE's result
1963 GE's result
1959 GE's result
Map of Nee Soon in 1955 GE (Within Sembawang ward)
Map of Nee Soon in 1959 GE
Map of Nee Soon in 1963 GE
Map of Nee Soon in 1968 GE
Map of Nee Soon in 1972 GE
Map of Nee Soon in 1976 GE
Map of Nee Soon in 1980 GE
Map of Nee Soon in 1984 GE
Map of Nee Soon in 1988 GE (Split into wards within Sembawang GRC, Nee Soon Central & South SMCs)

Yishun